Bostwick is an unincorporated community in Nuckolls County, Nebraska, United States.

History
A post office was established at Bostwick in 1885, and remained in operation until it was discontinued in 1969. Bostwick was named after either a settler or railroad official.

References

Unincorporated communities in Nuckolls County, Nebraska
Unincorporated communities in Nebraska